Tibiaster is a genus of Asian sheet weavers that was first described by A. V. Tanasevitch in 1987.

Species
 it contains only two species.
Tibiaster djanybekensis Tanasevitch, 1987 – Kazakhstan
Tibiaster wunderlichi Eskov, 1995 – Kazakhstan

See also
 List of Linyphiidae species (Q–Z)

References

Araneomorphae genera
Linyphiidae
Spiders of Asia